Milli Bus (Pashto/Persian: ملي بس, National Bus), also spelt Millie Bus, is a government-run bus service operating across Afghanistan. Operations are managed by the Afghan Ministry of Transport and Civil Aviation.

Operations 
The Milli Bus Enterprise, which runs the service, operates services primarily in Kabul, along with services in other areas including the Panjshir Province, Parwan, Kandahar, and Maidan Wardak.

Milli buses are among the cheapest mode of transport in Kabul, often resulting in overcrowding during peak hours.

History 
Milli Bus dates back to the late 1920s. In 1979 the company also operated a trolleybus system. The infrastructure of Millie Bus including parking lots, workshops and administrative sections were destroyed after 1992 due to the outbreak of civil war in Kabul. It was reported that in 2001, after the Taliban regime ended, only 50 buses were operating in Kabul.
Around 1000 buses were received as aid from India, Iran, Japan, and Pakistan over a period of a decade after the downfall of the erstwhile Taliban government. In 2014, it was reported that many of these buses were not operational as they had fallen into disrepair and since most of these buses were imported, the lack of spare parts hindered their repair operations. Under the National Institution Building Project of the United Nations Development Fund, a maintenance department was established and officers and engineers were given training in maintenance of buses as well as other fields such as drivers training by Indian automotive major Tata Motors.

In 2015 Millie Bus operations in Kabul was the subject of a documentary by Ariana Television Network.

References

Bus operating companies
Bus transport in Afghanistan